The Derbyshire County Council elections took place alongside the other 2021 local elections. All 64 seats to Derbyshire County Council were contested. The Conservatives retained control of the council with an increased majority. In addition, the Green Party gained representation for the first time.

Candidates 
Former MPs Ruth George and Edwina Currie stood against each other in Whaley Bridge with Ruth George emerging victorious. George lost her High Peak seat in 2019 and Currie lost her South Derbyshire seat in 1997.

Summary

Election result

|-

Division Results

Amber Valley

(10 seats, 9 electoral divisions)

Bolsover

Chesterfield

Derbyshire Dales

Erewash
(9 seats, 9 electoral divisions)

High Peak

North East Derbyshire

South Derbyshire

By-Elections between May 2021 - May 2025

Long Eaton

References 

Derbyshire County Council elections
2021 English local elections
2020s in Derbyshire